Sidorovka is a rural locality (a khutor) in Arzhanovskoye Rural Settlement, Alexeyevsky District, Volgograd Oblast, Russia. The population was 6 as of 2010.

Geography 
Sidorovka is located on the right bank of the Khopyor River, 42 km southeast of Alexeyevskaya (the district's administrative centre) by road. Pokruchinsky is the nearest rural locality.

References 

Rural localities in Alexeyevsky District, Volgograd Oblast